The 2017 New Jersey gubernatorial election was held on November 7, 2017, to elect a new governor of New Jersey. Incumbent Republican Governor Chris Christie was term-limited and could not seek a third consecutive term.

Primary elections took place on June 6, 2017. Kim Guadagno, the incumbent Lieutenant Governor of New Jersey, won the Republican primary for governor and chose Woodcliff Lake Mayor Carlos Rendo as her running mate. Phil Murphy, a banker and former U.S. Ambassador to Germany, won the Democratic primary, and chose former State Assembly Speaker Sheila Oliver as his running mate. Seth Kaper-Dale ran as the Green Party candidate with Lisa Durden, while Pete Rohrman ran as the Libertarian Party candidate with Karrese Laguerre. Matt Riccardi ran as the Constitution Party candidate. There were two other independent candidates on the ballot.

Murphy led throughout the general election with many analysts expecting a Democratic pickup. When polls closed on Election Day, Murphy was immediately declared the winner based on exit polling alone. Murphy received 56.0% of the vote to Guadagno's 41.9%.  Murphy slightly outperformed Hillary Clinton's 2016 presidential run in the state. 38.5% of registered voters cast ballots, marking the lowest turnout on record for a gubernatorial election in New Jersey.

2017 was the first New Jersey gubernatorial election since 1989 in which the Democratic candidate won Somerset County, as well as the first one since 2005 in which a Democrat won Burlington County, Middlesex County, Atlantic County, or Gloucester County. The latter two counties have not voted Democratic since. Murphy became the first New Jersey governor since Brendan Byrne in 1973 to win without any prior elected experience, and the first since Charles Edison in 1940 to win without holding any prior public office in the state. This is the first gubernatorial election since 1937 in which a Democrat won without winning Salem County.

Primary elections
Primary elections took place on June 6, 2017. New Jersey utilizes a semi-closed primary system, meaning that only registered party members may vote in primary elections. However, unaffiliated voters can change their party registration and vote in either party primary on election day.

The deadline to file petitions to qualify for primary elections was April 3; eleven contenders submitted petitions satisfying the requirement of 1,000 signatures. On April 18, as is required by the New Jersey Election Law Enforcement Commission, the candidates' financial disclosures, showing sources of earned income (e.g. salaries) and unearned income (e.g. investments), were made public.

Gubernatorial primary candidates utilized what is known as the "matching funds" program. Those who raised at least $430,000 qualified to receive two dollars in public money for every dollar raised privately. State law mandates that any primary candidates who qualify for matching funds must participate in at least two primary debates. Candidates who choose not to seek matching funds but commit to raising and spending at least $430,000 can also participate. As of May 8, primary candidates had received donations from ten states other than New Jersey.

The first debates were held on May 9, hosted by Stockton University. The Republicans debated first followed by the Democrats. The debates were live-streamed on Facebook, the university's website via Livestream, and on News 12 New Jersey. The live stream was simulcast in Spanish. The second Democratic debate was held on May 11,  the second Republican debate on May 18. They were co-hosted by PBS Member network NJTV and NJ Spotlight.

The Republican debates included two of the five candidates: Jack Ciattarelli and Kim Guadagno, who both qualified for matching funds. Hirsh Singh filed a lawsuit to enter the debates, claiming to have raised over $900,000 despite missing a deadline to file; his challenge was rejected by the state courts.

The Democratic debates included four of the six candidates: Jim Johnson, John Wisniewski (who both qualified for matching funds), Phil Murphy (who opted out of matching funds but had spent enough to qualify), and Raymond Lesniak (who did not raise enough to qualify for matching funds but loaned his campaign enough money to qualify for the debates).

Republican primary

Candidates

Declared
 Jack Ciattarelli, state representative 
 Kim Guadagno, Lieutenant Governor and Secretary of State
 Steven Rogers, Nutley Commissioner of Public Affairs
 Joseph Rudy Rullo, businessman and candidate for the U.S. Senate in 2012
 Hirsh Singh, engineer and businessman

Withdrawn
 Dana Wefer, chairwoman of the Hoboken Housing Authority

Declined
 Jon Bramnick, Minority Leader of the New Jersey General Assembly (ran for reelection)
 Randy Brown, mayor of Evesham Township
 Michael J. Doherty, state senator (ran for reelection)
 Thomas Kean Jr., Minority Leader of the New Jersey Senate and son of former governor Thomas Kean (ran for reelection)
 Kevin J. O'Toole, state senator
 Joe Piscopo, actor, comedian and radio show host

Fundraising

Endorsements

Polling

Results

Democratic primary

Candidates

Declared
 Bill Brennan, activist and former firefighter
 Jim Johnson, former U.S. Under Secretary of the Treasury for Enforcement
 Raymond Lesniak, state senator and former chairman of the New Jersey Democratic State Committee
 Phil Murphy, former United States Ambassador to Germany and former Goldman Sachs executive
 John Wisniewski, state assemblyman and former chairman of the New Jersey Democratic State Committee
 Mark Zinna, Tenafly Borough Council President

Withdrawn
 Paul Binetti, LGBT activist and nightclub manager (did not submit petitions)
 Monica Brinson, pharmaceutical sales representative (did not submit petitions)
 Bob Hoatson, sexual abuse victims advocate and former Catholic priest
 Lisa McCormick, weekly newspaper publisher (did not submit petitions)
 Titus Pierce, businessman and Iraq War veteran (did not submit petitions)

Declined
 Cory Booker, U.S. Senator
 Tom Byrne, former chairman of the New Jersey Democratic State Committee and son of former governor Brendan Byrne
 Richard Codey, state senator and former governor (running for re-election)
 Joseph N. DiVincenzo Jr., Essex County Executive
 Steven Fulop, mayor of Jersey City (running for re-election)
 Rush Holt Jr., former U.S. Representative
 Michael Murphy, lobbyist and candidate for governor in 1997
 Robert Russo, Deputy Mayor of Montclair Township
 Shavonda E. Sumter, state assemblywoman (running for re-election)
 Stephen M. Sweeney, president of the New Jersey Senate (running for re-election)

Fundraising

Endorsements

Polling

Results

Third parties and independents

Declared
 Gina Genovese (Independent), former mayor of Long Hill
 Seth Kaper-Dale (Green), pastor
 Matt Riccardi (Constitution), Marine veteran
 Pete Rohrman (Libertarian), retired U.S. Marine and nominee for Bergen County Freeholder in 2015 and 2016
 Vincent Ross (Independent), electrician

Withdrawn
 Karese Laguerre (Independent), dental hygienist (running for lieutenant governor on the Libertarian ticket)
 Jonathan Lancelot (Independent), computer technician
 Mike Price (Independent), businessman

Declined
 Joe Piscopo (Independent), actor, comedian, and radio show host

General election
Seven candidates were on the ballot in the November general election, the lowest number in a New Jersey gubernatorial contest since six ran in 1989.

Candidates

Major
The following candidates have qualified to appear in the state-sponsored debates:
 Kim Guadagno (Republican), Lieutenant Governor and Secretary of State of New Jersey
 Running mate: Carlos Rendo, Mayor of Woodcliff Lake
 Phil Murphy (Democratic), former United States Ambassador to Germany and former Goldman Sachs executive
 Running mate: Sheila Oliver, State Assemblywoman and former Speaker of the New Jersey General Assembly

Minor
The following third-party or independent candidates qualified for the ballot but did not raise enough money to qualify for state-sponsored debates:
 Gina Genovese (Reduce Property Taxes), former mayor of Long Hill
 Running mate: None (Genovese initially named Democratic campaign operative Derel Stroud as a running mate, who would later withdraw. No replacement was selected.)
 Seth Kaper-Dale (Green), pastor
 Running mate: Lisa Durden, media commentator and former Essex County College adjunct communications professor
 Matt Riccardi (Constitution), Marine veteran
 Running mate: None
 Pete Rohrman (Libertarian), retired U.S. Marine and nominee for Bergen County Freeholder in 2015 and 2016
 Running mate: Karese Laguerre, dental hygienist
 Vincent Ross (We The People), electrician
 Running mate: April A. Johnson

Debates

Fundraising

Endorsements

Predictions

Polling

Results

Results by county

Counties that flipped from Republican to Democratic
Atlantic (largest municipality: Egg Harbor Township)
Bergen (largest municipality: Hackensack)
Burlington (largest municipality: Evesham)
Cumberland (largest municipality: Vineland)
Camden (largest municipality: Cherry Hill)
Gloucester (largest municipality: Washington Township)
Middlesex (largest municipality: Edison)
Mercer (largest municipality: Hamilton Township)
Passaic (largest municipality: Paterson)
Union (largest municipality: Elizabeth)
Somerset (largest municipality: Franklin Township)

Results by congressional district
Murphy won 9 of 12 congressional districts, including two held by Republicans.

See also
 2017 United States gubernatorial elections
 2017 New Jersey elections

References

External links

Official campaign websites
 Phil Murphy (D) for Governor
 Kim Guadagno (R) for Governor
 Pete Rohrman (L) for Governor
 Seth Kaper-Dale (G) for Governor
 Matthew Riccardi (C) for Governor
 Gina Genovese (I) for Governor
Former campaign websites
 Jack Ciattarelli (R) for Governor 
 Steven Rogers (R) for Governor
 Joseph Rudy Rullo (R) for Governor
 Hirsh Singh (R) for Governor
 Paul Binetti (D) for Governor
 Bill Brennan (D) for Governor
 Monica Brinson (D) for Governor
 Jim Johnson (D) for Governor
 Raymond Lesniak (D) for Governor
 Lisa McCormick (D) for Governor
 Titus Pierce (D) for Governor
 John Wisniewski (D) for Governor
 Mark Zinna (D) for Governor
 Jonathan Lancelot (I) for Governor

2017
New Jersey
Gubernatorial
New Jersey gubernatorial